The Arab Volleyball Clubs Championship Cup Winners is a sport competition for club volleyball teams who won the cup trophies in their countries, played for the first time in 2000

Results

References

International volleyball competitions
Volleyball in the Arab world